"Baby, Baby, Baby" is a 1953 hit song by Teresa Brewer from the film, Those Redheads from Seattle. The song was written in 1950 by Jerry Livingston and lyricist Mack David. The song was sung by Brewer in the role of a singer, who appears through a red curtain line of dancing girls and commences the lyrics: "Baby, Baby, Baby love me love me do, Baby, Baby, Baby love me love true." The song reached No. 12 in the US hit parade in December 1953. Coral released the record first in 1953 as 9-61067 with the B-side, "I Guess It Was You All The Time", written by Hoagy Carmichael and Johnny Mercer, then in 1954 as an EP, EC 81086 with A2: "Jilted" Robert Colby and Dick Manning, Track B1:  "Chicago Style"	James Van Heusen and Johnny Burke, and B2 "My Sweetie Went Away (She Didn't Say Where, When Or Why)" written by Roy Turk, and Lou Handman.

The song was later covered by Mindy Carson, as the title track of Baby, Baby, Baby (1959) and by Jimmy Witherspoon also as the title track of an album entitled Baby, Baby, Baby (1963).

References

Songs written by Jerry Livingston
Songs with lyrics by Mack David
Teresa Brewer songs
1953 singles
1950 songs
Coral Records singles